Filippo Minarini (born 6 March 1994) is an Italian footballer who plays as defender.

Club career
On 18 January 2017, he joined Vibonese on loan.

References

1994 births
Living people
Sportspeople from Modena
Italian footballers
Association football defenders
Serie B players
Modena F.C. players
Footballers from Emilia-Romagna